Giglioni is a surname. Notable people with the surname include:

 Giovanni B. Giglioni (1929–2008), American business theorist and Professor of Management 
  (born 1964), American historian of science

See also
 Giglioli